The 1992 Iowa State Senate elections took place as part of the biennial 1992 United States elections. Iowa voters elected state senators in 32 of the state senate's 50 districts—all 25 of the even-numbered seats were up for regularly-scheduled elections and, due to the oddities of redistricting following the 1990 Census, seven of the odd-numbered seats were up as well. State senators serve four-year terms in the Iowa State Senate, with half of the seats traditionally up for election each cycle.

The Iowa General Assembly provides statewide maps of each district. To compare the effect of the 1991 redistricting process on the location of each district, contrast the previous map with the map used for 1992 elections.

The primary election on June 2, 1992 determined which candidates appeared on the November 3, 1992 general election ballot. Primary election results can be obtained here. General election results can be obtained here.

Following the previous election, Democrats had control of the Iowa state Senate with 28 seats to Republicans' 22 seats. On December 17, 1991 a special election in district 44 resulted in Albert Sorensen flipping a seat in favor of the Democrats. Therefore, on election day in November 1992, Democrats controlled 29 seats and Republicans had 21.

To reclaim control of the chamber from Democrats, the Republicans needed to net 5 Senate seats.

Democrats maintained control of the Iowa State Senate following the 1992 general election with the balance of power shifting to Democrats holding 27 seats and Republicans having 23 seats (a net gain of 2 seats for the Republicans).

Summary of results
NOTE: Most of the 25 odd-numbered districts did not have elections in 1992 so they are not listed here.
Also note, an asterisk (*) after a Senator's name indicates they were an incumbent re-elected, but to a new district number due to redistricting. 

Source:

Detailed Results
Reminder: All even-numbered Iowa Senate seats were up for election in 1992 as well as 7 odd-numbered districts due to the oddities caused by redistricting.

Note: If a district does not list a primary, then that district did not have a competitive primary (i.e., there may have only been one candidate file for that district).

District 2

District 3

District 4

District 6

District 8

District 10

District 12

District 14

District 16

District 18

District 20

District 21

District 22

District 24

District 26

District 27

District 28

District 30

District 32

District 34

District 36

District 37

District 38

District 40

District 41

District 42

District 44

District 45

District 46

District 48

District 49

District 50

See also
 United States elections, 1992
 United States House of Representatives elections in Iowa, 1992
 Elections in Iowa

References

1992 Iowa elections
Iowa Senate elections
Iowa State Senate